Robert F. Babcock (born August 3, 1968) is a Canadian former professional ice hockey defenceman who played two games in the National Hockey League for the Washington Capitals in the 1990s. He was selected by the Capitals in the 10th round (208th overall) of the 1986 NHL Entry Draft.

As a youth, he played in the 1981 Quebec International Pee-Wee Hockey Tournament with the Toronto Young Nationals minor ice hockey team.

Career statistics

References

External links

1968 births
Living people
Baltimore Skipjacks players
Binghamton Rangers players
Canadian ice hockey defencemen
Ice hockey people from Toronto
Sault Ste. Marie Greyhounds players
Washington Capitals draft picks
Washington Capitals players